The Party of Eros: Radical Social Thought and the Realm of Freedom is a book-length contemporaneous intellectual history of the New Left written by Richard King and published by University of North Carolina Press in 1972. It analyzes the intellectual development of figures including Norman O. Brown, Paul Goodman, Herbert Marcuse, Dwight Macdonald, and Wilhelm Reich.

Bibliography

External links 

 
 Full text at the Internet Archive

1972 non-fiction books
English-language books
University of North Carolina Press books
Intellectual history